Ciosaniec  (German: Ostlinde; before 1937: Schussenze) is a village in the administrative district of Gmina Sława, within Wschowa County, Lubusz Voivodeship, in western Poland.

The village has a population of 647.

References

Villages in Wschowa County